Majalli Wahabi (also spelled Majalli Wahbee, born 12 February 1954) is an Druze-Israeli politician who served as a member of the Knesset for Likud, Kadima and  Hatnuah between 2003 and 2013. He briefly assumed the position of Israel's Acting President due to President Moshe Katzav's leave of absence and Interim President Dalia Itzik's trip abroad in February 2007, making him the first non-Jew and the first Druze to be Israel's acting head of state.

Background
Wahabi was born on 12 February 1954 in the Druze village of Beit Jann, Israel. He earned a B.A. in the History of Islam from the Hebrew University of Jerusalem and an M.A. in the History of the New Middle East from the University of Haifa.

He served in the Israel Defense Forces. Initially assigned as an instructor at the intelligence school, he joined a Druze infantry battalion and became an officer. He served in the 1982 Lebanon War, and subsequently as a deputy brigade commander in the Golan Heights Division and as a senior Northern Command officer. He rose to the rank of Lieutenant-Colonel.

Wahabi is married with four children. Wahabi's son, Tomer, is the first Druze member of Israel Army Radio. He is fluent in Arabic, Hebrew, English, and French.

Political career
Wahabi met then-Defense Minister Ariel Sharon in 1981. Starting in 1996, he served as Sharon's personal ambassador to Israel's Arab neighbors, Egypt and Jordan.

He was elected to the 16th Knesset in 2003 on the Likud list. In March 2005 he was appointed Deputy Minister in the Ministry in the Prime Minister's Office, and became Deputy Minister of Education, Culture and Sport in June 2006.

When Sharon left Likud to found Kadima, Wahabi followed, and was elected to the 17th Knesset in 2006 on the Kadima list. He assumed the position of Deputy Speaker of the Knesset. In October 2007 he was added to Ehud Olmert's cabinet as Deputy Foreign Affairs Minister. He retained his seat in the 2009 elections after being placed 21st on the Kadima list.

His public activities include: 
Director General, the Ministry for Regional Cooperation (1999–2002)
Senior Political Advisor, Ministry of Foreign Affairs (1998–1999)
Aide to the Minister of Infrastructure (1996–1999) (Ariel Sharon)

On February 27, 2007, while then president Moshe Katzav was on leave of absence due to an indictment for rape charges, and interim president Dalia Itzik was on a trip abroad, Wahabi, who had previously served as interim speaker of the Knesset, was named acting president of Israel for two weeks, becoming the first non-Jew and Druze to be Israel's acting head of state.

Wahabi condemned a website that "incited against Israeli soldiers" as war criminals and published their personal information and called for the punishment of those responsible.

Shortly before the 2013 elections Wahabi joined the new Hatnuah party, and was placed twelfth on its list. He lost his seat as the party won only six seats.

See also
 List of Arab members of the Knesset
 List of Israeli Druze

References

External links

 

1954 births
Living people
Deputy ministers of Israel
Deputy Speakers of the Knesset
Druze members of the Knesset
Israeli Druze
Arab citizens of Israel
Hatnua politicians
Hebrew University of Jerusalem alumni
Kadima politicians
Likud politicians
Members of the 16th Knesset (2003–2006)
Members of the 17th Knesset (2006–2009)
Members of the 18th Knesset (2009–2013)
People from Beit Jann
University of Haifa alumni